The Canadian one-hundred-dollar note is one of five banknotes of the Canadian dollar. It is the highest-valued and least-circulated of the notes since the $1000 note was gradually removed from circulation starting in 2000.

The current 100-dollar note was put into circulation through major banks in November 2011, made of a durable polymer instead of the traditional paper notes. The notes are dominantly brown in colour; the front design of the note features former prime minister Robert Borden and the design on the back depicts the discovery of insulin. Security features introduced into the note design include two transparent windows, which make the notes harder to forge than the traditional notes. One window extends from the top to the bottom of the note and has holographic images inlaid. The other window is in the shape of a maple leaf. Additional features include transparent text, a metallic portrait, raised ink, and partially hidden numbers. The note's design and change of material to a polymer (plastic) paper, for longevity and counterfeit prevention, was first announced on 10 March 2011. On 20 June 2011, Bank of Canada governor Mark Carney and Finance Minister Jim Flaherty unveiled the new $100 notes.

The previous 100-dollar note is dominantly brown in colour. It is still largely in circulation. The front features a portrait of Robert Borden, the coat of arms, and a picture of the East Block of the Parliament buildings. Security features visible from the front include a hologram strip along the left side, depicting the number 100 alternated with maple leaves; a watermark of Borden's portrait; and a broken-up number 100, which resolves itself when backlit. The reverse side depicts themes in Canadian exploration, including a map drawn by Samuel de Champlain and a canoe that would be used in his era, as well as a telecommunications antenna, the RADARSAT-1 satellite and a satellite image of Canada; it also has a quotation from Miriam Waddington's poem "Jacques Cartier in Toronto". The reverse also has a visible security feature: an interleaved metallic strip, reading '100 CAN' repeatedly along its length. Yellow dots representing the EURion constellation can be found on both sides (and on all 2001 series notes). As well as textured printing, this new 2004 design incorporates a special tactile feature similar to Braille dots for the blind indicating the denomination. This design was placed into circulation on 17 March 2004.

The older "Birds of Canada" design remained in circulation as of late 2004. It featured, on the front, a portrait of Sir Robert Borden, the coat of arms, and a picture of the Centre Block of Parliament. On the reverse side was a wilderness scene with Canada geese. It also had a holographic sticker showing the amount in the top left side, which changes from gold to green when tilted.  The front had a wavy background of extremely small but still clear numeral 100s.  This "micro-printed" background is very hard to copy.  Some of the printing on a 100 is textured so that it is easy to feel, quite different from normal printing.

All Canadian banknotes underwent a major redesign in 1986, partially to incorporate some of the latest anti-forgery methods. Notes continue to be improved, with the latest notes made of a plastic material. Previously, notes were printed on paper composed of pure cotton at two Ottawa companies contracted for the purpose.  They are the Canadian Bank Note Company and BA International Inc., a part of the Giesecke & Devrient GmbH group of companies.

Each note in the 1988 series was sprinkled with special green ink dots that glow when exposed to ultraviolet light.  The ink can be scraped off, so worn notes tend to have fewer if any, glowing dots.  These were replaced with more permanent ultraviolet-detected threads in the new notes, as well as an ink imprint of the coat of arms.

Despite these numerous security features, many small and medium and even some large-sized Canadian retailers continue to implement policies wherein $100 notes are not accepted for use in customer transactions – such a policy is usually not only due to counterfeiting concerns but also theft concerns and to reduce the amount of cash needed to be kept on hand for change.

On 12 July 2012, it was reported that under certain conditions, these and the Canadian fifty-dollar note would shrink under intense heat.

On 18 August 2012, the Bank of Canada replaced an image of an Asian woman on the back of the notes with that of a European looking woman in response to the concerns from focus group participants about the stereotyping of Asians as excelling in technology. This led to a further controversy when the redesign was accused of favouring a white person as more neutral, causing an apology from Governor Mark Carney.

As with all modern Canadian banknotes, all text is in both English and French.

References

External links
Bank of Canada's banknote site
Bank of Canada ethnically cleanses new $100 bill: Mallick
http://www.theglobeandmail.com/news/british-columbia/article11965668.ece/BINARY/RCMP+release+shows+how+to+spot+a+fake+hundred.pdf

Banknotes of Canada by denomination
One-hundred-base-unit banknotes